Michael or Mike Wilson may refer to:

Arts and entertainment
 Michael Wilson (director) (born 1964), American theater director
 Michael Wilson (guitarist) (born 1952), Jamaican guitarist for Burning Spear from 1977 to 1984
 Michael Wilson (musician), bassist with Logan
 Michael Wilson (presenter), British journalist and business presenter
 Michael Wilson (writer) (1914–1978), Hollywood screenplay writer
 Michael G. Wilson (born 1942), producer and screenwriter of James Bond films
 Michael Henry Wilson (1901–1985), British anthroposophist and founder of Sunfield Children's Home, Clent
 Michael J. Wilson, American screenwriter
 Mike Wilson (executive) (born 1970), American entrepreneur in the video game industry 
 Mike Wilson (filmmaker) (born 1976), American documentary filmmaker
 Mike Wilson (writer, born 1974), American-Argentine writer

Politics and law
 Michael Wilson (Australian politician) (born 1934), member of the South Australian House of Assembly, 1977–1985
 Michael Wilson (Canadian politician) (1937–2019), Canadian politician and diplomat
 Mike Wilson (Kentucky politician) (born 1951), member of the Kentucky Senate
 Mike Wilson (South Dakota politician), member of the South Dakota House of Representatives, Democratic nominee for lieutenant governor in 2002
 Michael D. Wilson, Hawaii judge

Sports
 Michael Wilson (basketball), former player of the Harlem Globetrotters and the University of Memphis, also known as "Wild Thing"
 Mike Wilson (basketball) (born 1959), American basketball guard
 Michael Wilson (Australian footballer) (born 1976), former Australian rules footballer for Port Adelaide Football Club
 Michael Wilson (New Zealand footballer) (born 1980), New Zealand association football player
 Mike Wilson (1920s athlete) (1896–1978), American baseball and football player
 Mike Wilson (outfielder) (born 1983), American baseball player
 Mike Wilson (ice hockey) (born 1975), Canadian ice hockey defenceman
 Mike Wilson (offensive lineman) (born 1955), American football offensive lineman
 Michael Wilson (offensive lineman) (born 1947), gridiron football offensive lineman
 Mike Wilson (wide receiver) (born 1958), American football wide receiver for the San Francisco 49ers
 Mike Wilson (boxer) (born 1983), American boxer
 Michael Wilson (cyclist) (born 1960), Australian cyclist
 Mike Wilson (skier) (born 1986), American freeskier
 Michael Wilson (cricketer) (1940–2015), New Zealand cricketer

Characters
 Michael Wilson, protagonist of the video game Metal Wolf Chaos

Others
Michael Wilson (guide) (born 1972 or 1973), Queen's Guide to the Sands, Morecambe Bay, England

See also
 List of people with surname Wilson
 Mick Wilson (disambiguation)